Trpín is a municipality and village in Svitavy District in the Pardubice Region of the Czech Republic. It has about 400 inhabitants.

Administrative parts
The village of Hlásnice is an administrative part of Trpín.

Geography
It lies in the Upper Svratka Highlands.

History
The first written mention of Trpín is from 1349. The village of Hlásnice was first mentioned in 1437.

Sights
The Church of Saint Wenceslaus is the landmark of Trpín. It was consecrated in 1689, but the construction was not completed until 1720. There is a wooden belfry next to the church.

Notable people
Otakar Sedloň (1885–1973), painter

Twin towns – sister cities

Trpín is twinned with:
 Palkonya, Hungary

References

External links

Villages in Svitavy District